Amaia Salamanca Urízar (born 28 March 1986) is a Spanish actress, best known for her role as Catalina Marcos in the Spanish version of the Colombian TV series Sin tetas no hay paraíso and as Alicia Alarcón in series Gran Hotel.

Biography 

Amaia Salamanca was born in Coslada on 28 March 1986. Initially, she was not planning to go into acting, but in her first audition, for SMS, the television channel TV company LaSexta gave her first acting job. In SMS, she worked with other young film and television actors such as Yon González, Aroa Gimeno, Mario Casas and María Castro.

Besides her work as an actress, Amaia works as a model for photo shoots, video clips and shows.

Career 
She made a theater debut in 2009 with The Marquise of O, by Heinrich von Kleist. In 2010 she played Letizia Ortiz in the TV movie Felipe y Letizia.

In the media 
In October 2020, Salamanca became an ambassador for Codorníu and the protagonist of its new campaign 'Live to celebrate'.

Filmography

Theatre  
 2009 The Marquise of O (Debut)

Accolades

References

External links 
 
 

1986 births
People from Salamanca
Living people
Spanish television actresses
Spanish female models
Actresses from the Community of Madrid
Spanish film actresses
Spanish people of Basque descent